The Institut Florimont is a school in Geneva. It was founded in 1905 by the Congrégation des Missionnaires de Saint François de Sales, soon after a law in France prohibited religious congregations of any persuasion. The Institut Florimont started out as a private catholic French-speaking boarding school for boys.

However, the school has been directed by a lay person since 1995, and has accepted girls at the secondary II level since 1978. In 1995, the entire school became co-ed, boarding was no longer offered, and the pre-school classes were opened.

Accreditation
Florimont's (upper) secondary education (Middle and High School) is approved as a Mittelschule/Collège/Liceo by the Swiss Federal State Secretariat for Education, Research and Innovation (SERI)., one of only two private schools in the canton to receive the accreditation.

Curriculum
The school offers a complete curriculum from pre-school (starting at 3 years). Students can choose to complete their studies in any of the following three branches: the cantonal maturité gymnasiale; the French baccalauréat, and the IB Diploma Programme.

Principal
The current principal is Sean Power.

Notable alumni
 Benjamin de Rothschild
Christopher Lambert
Vittorio Emanuele, Prince of Naples
Alain Morisod
John Dupraz
Dominique Warluzel
Joachim Havard de la Montagne

References

External links 

 site officiel de l'Institut Florimont
 AGEP - Association Genevoise des Ecoles Privées

International schools in Switzerland
Private schools in Switzerland
International Baccalaureate schools in Switzerland
Educational institutions established in 1905
1905 establishments in Switzerland